The Great British Bake Off is a British television baking competition to find Britain's best amateur baker. The show premiered in 2010, and is airing its thirteenth series in 2022. From series two onwards, Judges Paul Hollywood and Mary Berry (through 2016) or Prue Leith (since 2017) have awarded "Star Baker" to the contestant deemed to have most excelled that particular week. 

Numerous bakers have received the accolade on more than one occasion. For example, Ruby Tandoh in series four won the Star Baker title three times. Richard Burr currently holds the title record, winning five times (of a possible nine). Each series winner has usually received the Star Baker award at some point, but the accolade holds no influence on the outcome.

List of bakers

Notes
 Richard Burr, Ian Cummings, Steph Blackwell and Syabira Yusoff of series 5, 6, 10 and 13 respectively have the longest collective run of Star Baker wins, each winning the accolade three weeks consecutively in their series. Burr also has the largest number of star baker wins, with five.
 In series 6, contestant Paul Jagger was awarded a "special commendation" for his bread sculpture.
 Series 10 winner David Atherton is the only winner to have never won star baker.

See also
 List of The Great British Bake Off contestants
 List of The Great British Bake Off finalists

References

British television-related lists
Lists of reality show participants